The Novgorod Judicial Charter (Russian: Новгородская судная грамота) was an Old Russian legal code of the Novgorod Republic, issued in 1440, although the current version was supplemented in 1471 under the auspices of Grand Prince Ivan III (r, 1462–1505), and his son, Ivan Ivanovich [1458-90; predeceased his father and never reigned] and

according to the blessing of the hieromonk Feofil who was named to the archbishopric of Novgorod the Great and Pskov, so [then] the mayors of Novgorod, and the Novgorod millenariuses, and boyars, and ranking men, and merchants, and taxpaying townsmen, all five boroughs (kontsy) [of Novgorod], [and] all Lord Novgorod the Great at assembly (veche) in Iaroslav's court 

The charter exists in only one copy with the end missing.  While it was issued very late in the history of the Novgorod Republic, it probably codified practices that had existed for some time.  It allowed for four sets of courts: the ecclesiastical, headed by the archbishop of Novgorod); the mayoral, headed by the posadnik; the princely, headed by the prince or his namestnik (lieutenant); and the tysyatsky's, headed by the tysyatsky, who was originally head of the town militia, although the court probably served as a commercial court.

The various provisions of the charter dealt with administrative matters, the collection of court fees and stipulated that cases had to be completed before a posadnik left office (they were elected annually).  It did not deal with particular crimes as such.  That was dealt with in the Russkaya Pravda.

The Novgorod Judicial Charter, along with the similar Pskov Judicial Charter, are considered more sophisticated than Muscovite law of the time, and contributing factors in Ivan III's issuance of the Sudebnik of 1497.

References

The reference to Vol. 3 of the Cambridge History of Russia is wrong.  It should be cited as Vol. 1, at pp. 371–374, also at pp. 364–365.

External links
 The Novgorod Judicial Charter

See also

 Old Russian Law
 Russkaya Pravda

Novgorod Republic
Legal history of Russia
Medieval legal codes
East Slavic manuscripts
Cyrillic manuscripts
1440s in law
1440 in Europe
15th century in Russia